Clearwater River Dene Band 221 is an Indian reserve of the Clearwater River Dene Nation in Saskatchewan.

References

Indian reserves in Saskatchewan
Division No. 18, Saskatchewan